Lindborg-Cregg Memorial Field is a stadium in Missoula, Montana.  It holds 2,200 people.  It is the home of the Missoula Mavericks, an American Legion Baseball team. It is primarily used for baseball and was home to the Missoula Osprey prior to Ogren Park at Allegiance Field's opening for the 2004 season.

References

Baseball venues in Montana
Minor league baseball venues
Buildings and structures in Missoula County, Montana
Sports in Missoula, Montana